Biblioteca Nazionale may refer to one of four national libraries in Italy:

Biblioteca Nazionale Centrale Firenze in Florence
Biblioteca Nazionale Centrale Roma in Rome
Biblioteca Nazionale Vittorio Emanuele III in Naples
Turin National University Library, Biblioteca nazionale universitaria

or to the Biblioteca nazionale svizzera (official name in Italian of the Swiss National Library)